"Close to Me" has been confirmed as the third and final official single from G-Unit's second album, T·O·S (Terminate on Sight).

Background
Despite T.O.S.: Terminate on Sight doing decent sales G-Unit managed to release a third single. In an interview with G-Unit, Tony Yayo explained the track "Straight Outta Southside" is his favorite track off the album, with "T.O.S. (Terminate on Sight)" being Lloyd Banks' and "Close to Me" being 50 Cent's, hence "Close to Me" being the third single.

Originally "Party Ain't Over" was going to be the fourth and final single, but due to the lack of support from Interscope, a fourth single was never made, which makes "Close To Me" the third and final single from the album.

Music video
The music video premiered on This Is 50. The music video is animated, like the video for "Piggy Bank" and the song "My Buddy".

References

2008 singles
2008 songs
G-Unit songs
Songs written by 50 Cent
Songs written by Lloyd Banks
Songs written by Tony Yayo
G-Unit Records singles
Animated music videos